Kežmarok District (Slovak: okres Kežmarok) is a district in
the Prešov Region of eastern Slovakia. 
Its seat, cultural and economic center is Kežmarok, the traditional center of the historic Spiš region. The Kežmarok district was established in 1923 and exists in its present borders from 1996. Currently it consists of 42 municipalities, from which 3 have a town status. Main economic branches are industry and tourism. In the Kežmarok district Slovakia's top tourist attractions are located such as Pieniny National Park with easy access to the High Tatra Mountains. The district lies mainly on a foothills of High Tatras.

Kežmarok district borders Stará Ľubovňa District, Levoča District, Poprad District, Sabinov District and Poland.

Municipalities

Canceled 
 Javorina

Local Enterprises 
 Isometall, s.r.o. - metal (steel, iron, etc.) manufacture - (http://www.isometall.sk)

References 

 
Districts of Slovakia